Thomas Bain (December 14, 1834 – January 18, 1915) was a Scottish born  Canadian parliamentarian.

Bain was born in Scotland, the son of Walter Bain, and migrated to Canada with his family when he was three years old. They settled on a bush farm in Wentworth County  near Hamilton, Ontario.

He was elected to the County Council in the 1860s and became Warden. He was first elected to the House of Commons of Canada in the 1872 federal election as a Liberal. He was re-elected on six subsequent occasions, serving as an MP for 28 years before retiring in 1900. In the House, he usually spoke on agricultural issues, and became Chairman of the Committee on Agriculture and Colonization in 1896.

In 1874, he married Helen Weir.

When the Speaker of the House of Commons of Canada, James David Edgar, died unexpectedly in July 1899, Wilfrid Laurier asked Bain to become the new Speaker for the remainder of Egar's term.

Bain served as Speaker until the House was dissolved for the 1900 election in which he did not run.

After retiring from politics, Bain became President of the Landed Banking and Loan Company and the Malcolm and Souter Furniture Company. He died in Dundas, Ontario at age 80.

Archives 
There is a Thomas Bain fonds at Library and Archives Canada. Archival reference number is R11196.

References

External links
 

1834 births
1915 deaths
Liberal Party of Canada MPs
Members of the House of Commons of Canada from Ontario
Scottish emigrants to pre-Confederation Ontario
Speakers of the House of Commons of Canada
Immigrants to Upper Canada